SWOQe is a method of strategic planning which derived from SWOT. SWOQe contains the same letters S, W and O with their meanings from SWOT Analysis involved in a project or in a business venture. SWOQe can be defined as Strength, Weakness, Opportunity and most importantly Quality evaluation as a part of analysis. SWOQe and SWOT differ in just one element. SWOQe does emphasize on Quality evaluation in end while SWOT on Threats in end. SWOQe method of analysis came into existence recently from an analysis where Threat was not there or not important as Quality evaluation was.

Analysis